The Purcell School for Young Musicians is a specialist music school for children, located in the town of Bushey, south Hertfordshire, England, and is the oldest specialist music school in the UK.  The school was awarded the UNESCO Mozart Medal in 2003, which was received on behalf of the school by King Charles, who is a patron of the school.  Sir Simon Rattle is honorary president of the school. Many of the pupils subsequently study at top conservatories across the country including: the Royal College of Music, the Royal Academy of Music and the Guildhall School of Music and Drama. In 2015, the School became the first Fazioli Pianoforti Centre of Excellence.

The School's pupils are funded largely by the Government's Music and Dance Scheme, along with the School's own scholarship funds. It has a consistent success in national and international competitions and has an extensive programme of outreach and community work. The majority of pupils progress to music conservatoires although a small number each year elect to go to University to study both music and non-musical subjects.

History
Rosemary Rapaport and Irene Forster founded the school in 1962 under the original name of the Central Tutorial School for Young Musicians, at Conway Hall in central London. The school later moved to Morley College, and subsequently to Hampstead, then to a large Victorian house in Harrow on the Hill.

The school changed its name in 1973 to The Purcell School (after the English composer Henry Purcell).  In 1997, the school relocated to the site of the former Royal Caledonian School campus in Bushey, Hertfordshire.

Notable former pupils

Martin James Bartlett, BBC Young Musician of the Year 2014
Katharine Blake, Kelly McCusker and Jocelyn West, vocalists and founder members of the a cappella ensemble Miranda Sex Garden 
Sona Jobarteh Gambian vocalist, multi-instrumentalist
Daisy Chute, singer with classical-pop group All Angels
Robert Cohen, cellist
Jacob Collier, five time Grammy awarded singer, arranger, composer, producer, and multi-instrumentalist
Nicholas Daniel, oboist
Anne Denholm, harpist, Official Harpist to the Prince of Wales 2015
Julius Drake, pianist
Catrin Finch, harpist
Teo Gheorghiu, pianist and actor
Ploypailin Mahidol Jensen, pianist, a granddaughter of King Bhumibol Adulyadej of Thailand.
Oliver Knussen, composer and conductor
Oliver Lewis, violinist
Jack Liebeck, violinist
Tirzah, singer-songwriter
Lara Melda, BBC Young Musician of the Year, 2010
Micachu, experimental pop musician
Leona Naess, singer-songwriter
Sarah Oates, violinist and associate leader Philharmonia orchestra
Joseph Phibbs, composer
Paul Sartin, oboist, violinist and singer with Bellowhead, and others
Yevgeny Sudbin, pianist
Alexander Ullman, pianist
Yiruma, South Korean pianist

References

External links

Profile on the ISC website

Music schools in England
Private schools in Hertfordshire
Educational institutions established in 1962
Boarding schools in Hertfordshire
1962 establishments in England